In the United Kingdom, students' unions are organisations that exist at universities to represent the interests of students. Although most are known as Students' Unions other common terms include Guilds of Students and Students' Associations, the latter being the more common term in Scotland. Student unions facilitate student societies, such as sports clubs and student newspapers, as well as representing students politically to their respective universities and at a national level. However, it is possible for individual students not to be a member of their union.

The majority of unions are affiliated with the National Union of Students, although a minority are not and unions can disaffiliate from the NUS.  There are several other representative bodies of which unions may be members such as the Aldwych Group, for unions of Russell Group institutions, and the National Postgraduate Committee, which represents postgraduate students. In Northern Ireland, all unions are members of the National Union of Students-Union of Students in Ireland.

Students' unions tend to be run by a team of student-elected sabbatical officers. Funding for the unions comes from a "block grant" from the university and the provision of services to members through the running of shops and bars. Students' unions are regulated under the Education Act 1994, an Act of Parliament which states that student unions must be run in a democratic manner. Edinburgh University Students' Association is the oldest students' union in the United Kingdom and Liverpool Guild of Students is England's oldest students' union. The University of Glasgow is unique in having two independent students' unions, although undergraduates usually only join one of these (but can choose to join both). Some Common Rooms at collegiate universities also have the status of students' unions under the 1994 Education Act and exist as independent charities.

Notes
Further education colleges can have student unions (which may also be members of the NUS), however, this article only lists higher education unions
This article lists all higher education unions regardless of whether they are affiliated to the NUS
Members of the University of London are listed under "L"

A
University of Aberdeen
Aberdeen University Students' Association
University of Abertay Dundee
University of Abertay Dundee Students' Association
Aberystwyth University
Aberystwyth Guild of Students
Anglia Ruskin University
Anglia Ruskin Students' Union
University of the Arts London
University of the Arts London Students' Union
Arts University Bournemouth
Arts University Bournemouth Students' Union]
Aston University
Aston Students' Union

B

Bangor University
Bangor University Students' Union
University of Bath
University of Bath Students' Union
Bath Spa University
Bath Spa University Students' Union
University of Bedfordshire
University of Bedfordshire Students' Union
University of Birmingham
University of Birmingham Guild of Students
Birmingham City University
Birmingham City Students' Union
Bishop Grosseteste University
Bishop Grosseteste Students Union 
University Centre at Blackburn College
Blackburn College Students' Union
University of Bolton
University of Bolton Students' Union
Bournemouth University
Students' Union at Bournemouth University
University of Bradford
University of Bradford Union
University of Brighton
University of Brighton Students' Union
University of Bristol
University of Bristol Union
Brunel University
Union of Brunel Students
University of Buckingham
University of Buckingham Students' Union

C

University of Cambridge
Cambridge Students' Union
 Colleges:
Christ's College Graduate Society
Corpus Christi College Junior Combination Room
Downing College Junior Common Room
 Downing College Middle Common Room
Fitzwilliam College Junior Members' Association
 Girton College Junior Combination Room
 Girton College Middle Combination Room
 Sidney Sussex College Students’ Union
Trinity College Students' Union
Canterbury Christ Church University
Christ Church Students' Union
 Canterbury College
 Canterbury College Students' Union 
Cardiff Metropolitan University
Cardiff Met SU
Cardiff University
Cardiff University Students' Union
University of Central Lancashire
University of Central Lancashire Students' Union
University of Chester
Chester Students' Union
University of Chichester
University of Chichester Students' Union
Crichton University Campus, Dumfries
Crichton University Campus Students' Association
City University London
City University Students' Union
Courtauld Institute of Art
Courtauld Institute of Art Students' Union
Coventry University
Coventry University Students' Union
Cranfield University
Cranfield Students' Association
University for the Creative Arts
University for the Creative Arts Students' Union
University of Cumbria
University of Cumbria Students' Union

D
De Montfort University
De Montfort Students' Union
University of Derby
University of Derby Students' Union
University of Dundee
Dundee University Students' Association
Durham University
Durham Students' Union
Maintained colleges:
Grey College Junior Common Room
Hatfield College Junior Common Room
Josephine Butler College Junior Common Room
St Aidan's College Junior Common Room
St Cuthbert's Society Junior Common Room
Ustinov College Graduate Common Room
Van Mildert College Junior Common Room
 Recognised colleges:
St John's Common Room

E

University of East Anglia
Union of UEA Students
Edge Hill University
Edge Hill Students' Union
University of Edinburgh
Edinburgh University Students' Association
Edinburgh Napier University
Napier Students' Association
 Edinburgh's Telford College
 Edinburgh's Telford College Student Union
University of Essex 
Essex University Students' Union
University of Exeter
Exeter Students Guild
Falmouth and Exeter Students' Union

G

University of Glamorgan
University of Glamorgan Union
University of Glasgow
Glasgow University Students' Representative Council
Glasgow University Union
Queen Margaret Union
Glasgow Caledonian University
Glasgow Caledonian University Students' Association
Glasgow School of Art
Glasgow School of Art Students' Association 
University of Gloucestershire
University of Gloucestershire Students' Union
Glyndŵr University
Glyndŵr University Students' Guild
Goldsmiths College
Goldsmiths Students' Union
University of Greenwich
Students' Union University of Greenwich

H
Heriot-Watt University
Heriot-Watt University Students Association
University of Hertfordshire
University of Hertfordshire Students' Union
University of Huddersfield
Huddersfield Students Union
University of Hull
Hull University Union
Hull College Group
Hull College Group Students' Union

I
Imperial College London
Imperial College Union

K
Keele University
Keele University Students' Union
Keele Postgraduate Association
University of Kent
University of Kent Students' Union
King's College London
King's College London Students' Union
University of Kingston
Kingston University Students' Union

L

University of Wales, Lampeter
University of Wales Lampeter Students Union
Lancaster University
Lancaster University Students' Union
University of Leeds
Leeds University Union
Leeds Beckett University
Leeds Beckett Student Union
Leeds Trinity University
Leeds Trinity Students' Union
University of Leicester
University of Leicester Students' Union
University of Lincoln
University of Lincoln Students' Union
University of Liverpool
Liverpool Guild of Students
Liverpool Hope University
Liverpool Hope Students' Union
Liverpool John Moores University
Liverpool Students' Union
Loughborough University
Loughborough Students' Union

London

University of London
University of London Union (Abolished)
Birkbeck, University of London
Birkbeck Students' Union
City University
City University London Students' Union
Courtauld Institute of Art
Courtauld Institute of Art Students' Union
University of East London
University of East London Students' Union
St George's, University of London
St George's Students' Union
Goldsmiths, University of London
Goldsmiths Students' Union
King's College London
King's College London Students' Union
London Metropolitan University
London Metropolitan University Students' Union
University of London Institute in Paris
University of London Institute in Paris Students' Union
London South Bank University
London South Bank University Students' Union
University College London
University College London Union
London School of Economics
LSE Students' Union
Royal Holloway, University of London
Royal Holloway Students' Union
Queen Mary, University of London
Queen Mary Students' Union

M

University of Manchester
University of Manchester Students' Union
Manchester Metropolitan University
The Union MMU
Middlesex University
Middlesex University Students' Union

N

Newcastle University
Newcastle University Students' Union
Newman University
Newman Student Union
University of Wales, Newport
Newport Students' Union
Northampton College
Northampton College Students' Union
University of Northampton
University of Northampton Students' Union
Northumbria University
Northumbria Students' Union
Norwich University of the Arts
Norwich University of the Arts Students' Union
University of Nottingham
University of Nottingham Students' Union
Nottingham Trent University
Nottingham Trent Students' Union

O
Open University
Open University Students Association
University of Oxford
Oxford University Student Union
Oxford Brookes University
Oxford Brookes Students' Union

P
Plymouth College of Art
 Plymouth College of Art Students' Union
University of Plymouth
University of Plymouth Student Union
University of Portsmouth
University of Portsmouth Students' Union

Q

Queen's University Belfast
Queen's University Belfast Students' Union
Queen Margaret University
Queen Margaret University College Students' Union

R
University of Reading
Reading University Students' Union
The Robert Gordon University 
Robert Gordon University Student Association
Roehampton University 
Roehampton University Students Union
The Royal Central School of Speech and Drama
Central Students’ Union
Royal College of Art 
Royal College of Art Students' Union

S
University of St Andrews
University of St Andrews Students' Association
University of Salford
University of Salford Students' Union
School of Oriental and African Studies
SOAS Students' Union
University of Sheffield
University of Sheffield Union of Students
Sheffield Hallam University
Sheffield Hallam Union
University of Southampton
University of Southampton Students' Union
Southampton Solent University
Solent University Students' Union
Staffordshire University
Staffordshire University Students' Union
University of Stirling
Stirling University Students' Association
University of Strathclyde
University of Strathclyde Students' Association
University Campus Suffolk
University Campus Suffolk Students' Union
University of Sunderland
University of Sunderland Students' Union
University of Surrey
University of Surrey Students Union
University of Sussex
University of Sussex Students' Union
Swansea Metropolitan University
Swansea Metropolitan Student Union
Swansea University
Swansea University Students' Union

T
University of Teesside
Teesside Students Union
Thames Valley University
Thames Valley University Students' Union

W

University of Warwick
University of Warwick Students' Union
University of Westminster
Westminster Students Union
University of the West of England
UWE Students' Union
University of the West of Scotland
Student Association of the University of the West of Scotland
University of Winchester
Winchester Student Union
University of Worcester
 Worcester Students' Union
University of Wolverhampton
Wolverhampton Students Union

Y
University of York
University of York Students' Union
York St John University
York St John Students' Union

See also
List of trade unions in the United Kingdom
Student unionism in the United Kingdom
List of universities in the United Kingdom
National Union of Students of the United Kingdom
National Union of Students Scotland
NUS-USI – a joint project between the National Union of Students of the United Kingdom and the Union of Students in Ireland
Coalition of Higher Education Students in Scotland, now defunct.
National Postgraduate Committee
Aldwych Group

References

External links
National Union of Students

National Union of Students (United Kingdom)
Higher education in the United Kingdom
Students' unions in the United Kingdom
Students' Unions
Students' Unions